The Lake Meston is a natural lake that is located in the central northern region of Tasmania, Australia in the Walls of Jerusalem National Park, and is the source of the Mersey River.

Early Inhabitants
In 1922, brothers Arthur and Percy Youd built a hut at Lake Meston establishing a large hunting territory for fur that covered a wide area to the north, east and south of the lake. Percy became ill and died in 1928, Arthur continued to hunt from Lake Meston for 60 Years.

Arthur was trapped in his hut by snow at one stage. This story was relayed to Dick Read another Bushmen that roamed the highlands and was incorporated into the design of a new hut built by Dick and his friends at Lake Meston.

Recent use
The hut is now used by bushwalkers and keen fishermen alike.

Rainbow trout were first introduced into these waterways by the one and only airdrop of rainbows into Lake Meston in the 1950s.

References

Meston
Central Highlands (Tasmania)
Mersey River (Tasmania)